Alejandro Lerroux García (4 March 1864, in La Rambla, Córdoba – 25 June 1949, in Madrid) was a Spanish politician who was the leader of the Radical Republican Party. He served as Prime Minister three times from 1933 to 1935 and held several cabinet posts as well. A highly charismatic politician, he was distinguished by his demagogical and populist political style.

Biography
He was initiated as Freemason around 1886 in the Madrid's Vetonica lodge of the Grand Orient of Spain, but his activity was limited, among other reasons due to his disillusion with the prospects this membership offered to his immediate purposes.

Lerroux agitated as a young man in the ranks of the radical republicans, as a follower of Manuel Ruiz Zorrilla. He practised a demagogic and aggressive journalistic style in the diverse publications that he directed (El País, El Progreso, El Intransigente and El Radical).

From the 1890s onwards Lerroux radicalized his discourse. His populist and anticlerical speeches, as well as his intervention in diverse campaigns against the governments of the Restoration, made him very popular among workers in Barcelona, who later constituted the base of a loyal electorate. A prominent anti-catalanist, he became known as the "Emperor of the Paralelo". In 1898 and 1899, he organized through his newspapers a campaign for the judicial review of the Montjuic trial in which forced confessions through torture had led to the execution of some of the suspects. This contributed to his rise as a left-wing political force in Barcelona.

In 1906, Lerroux rallied his followers with the following exhortation: "Young barbarians of today: enter and sack the decadent civilization of this unhappy country, destroy its temples, finish off its gods, tear the veil from its novices and raise them up to be mothers to virilize the species, break into the records of property and make bonfires of its papers that fire may purify the infamous social organization. Enter its humble hearths and raise the legions of proletarians that the world may tremble before their awakened judges. Do not be stopped by altars nor by tombs. Fight, kill, die".

He was elected as a member of the Congress of Deputies for the first time in 1901 and again in 1903 and 1905, as a member of the Republican Union Party that he had helped to form with Nicolás Salmerón. The defection of Salmerón to the Catalan Solidarity coalition in 1906 led Lerroux to form the Radical Republican Party (1908) and headed the struggle against increasing Catalan nationalism. There are some evidence that both Francisco Ferrer and Lerroux may have participated in the hatching of two different plots to assassinate king Alfonso XIII in 1905 and 1906. He had to go into exile on several occasions, first to escape condemnation dictated by one of his articles (1907) and later fleeing from governmental repression in response to the Tragic Week in Barcelona (1909). 

After returning to Spain, Lerroux agreed to join the Republican–Socialist Conjunction, and he was elected as a deputy again in 1910. Afterwards, he was involved in a series of scandals that moved him away from his Barcelona electorate, with corruption accusations forcing him into a change of district, appearing for Córdoba in 1914). From 1919 he was on the payroll of Barcelona Traction, part of the Anglo-Canadian Traction, Light, and Power Company.

Under the dictatorship of Miguel Primo de Rivera (1923–30), his party was debilitated when its left-wing, led by Marcelino Domingo, left to form the Radical Socialist Republican Party in 1929. However, he continued to be active in politics, attending the revolutionary committee that produced the Pact of San Sebastián with the intention of overthrowing King Alfonso XIII and proclaiming a republic.

Second Republic
Under the republican regime, Lerroux regained a leading political role, being appointed prime minister three times between and occupying the distinguished ministerial portfolios.

He was part of the coalition of leftists that supported the reforms of Manuel Azaña's government during the first biennium (1931–1933), during which time he served as Minister of State between 14 April 1931 and 16 December 1931. From 12 September to 9 October 1933, he was Prime Minister.

After the victory of the Spanish Confederation of the Autonomous Right (CEDA) in the elections of autumn 1933, Lerroux again became prime minister, mainly because the President did not wish to appoint CEDA leader José María Gil-Robles y Quiñones. As such, he served from 16 December 1933 to 28 April 1934 and again from 4 October 1934 to 25 September 1935. He also served as minister of war (1934), state (1935) and foreign affairs (1935).

After distinguishing himself in the repression of the attempted workers' revolution of 1934, he was discredited by the Straperlo affair (a case of corruption bound to gambling legalization), which completely broke his alliance with the right and even weakened his position within the party.

In the elections of 1936, Lerroux was not even elected as a deputy. The same year, the Spanish Civil War broke out, and he preferred to place himself out of danger in Portugal. He returned to Spain in 1947.

See also
Catalan nationalism
 ¡Cu-Cut! and El Be Negre

References

External links 

 "Público" - La II República Española en su 80 aniversario: Protagonistas
Poster of the Radical Republican Party with Alejandro Lerroux
Illustrious Cordobese People 
 

1864 births
1949 deaths
People from Campiña Sur (Córdoba)
Republican Union Party (Spain) politicians
Radical Republican Party politicians
Prime Ministers of Spain
Foreign ministers of Spain
Members of the Congress of Deputies of the Spanish Restoration
Members of the Congress of Deputies of the Second Spanish Republic
Politicians from Andalusia
Spanish Freemasons
Exiles of the Spanish Civil War in Portugal
Spanish people of French descent
Exiled Spanish politicians
Government ministers during the Second Spanish Republic